Diego Domínguez born December 20, 1972, is a rally driver from Paraguay who currently competes in the Paraguay Rally Championship. He made his WRC debut at the 2000 Rally Argentina and at the 2015 rally scored his first ever WRC points.

Career results

WRC results

WRC-2 results

IRC results

References

External links
Profile at eWRC-Results.com

1972 births
Living people
World Rally Championship drivers
Paraguayan rally drivers